Arichua (possibly from Aymara or Quechua for a kind of potatoes) is a mountain in the Andes of southern Peru, about  high. It is situated in the Moquegua Region, Mariscal Nieto Province, Carumas District, and in the Tacna Region, Candarave Province, Candarave District. Arichua lies southwest of the mountain Huarintapaña.

References

Mountains of Moquegua Region
Mountains of Tacna Region
Mountains of Peru